Nabas may refer to:

 Nabas, Aklan, a municipality in the Philippines
 Nabas, Pyrénées-Atlantiques, a commune in southwestern France
 NABAS (National Association of Balloon Artists & Suppliers), an independent national trade association for the UK balloon industry

See also
 Naba (disambiguation)